Moosa Colony (}) (Bengali: মূসা কলোনি) is one of the neighbourhoods of Gulberg Town in Karachi, Sindh, Pakistan.

Fish Market 
A prominent fish market is located in Moosa Colony.

Demography 
The residents of Moosa Colony include Bengalis, Muhajirs, Punjabis, Rohingyas and Pashtuns.

Encroached Land 
Many of the houses of the region are built on encroached land, and anti-encroachment drivers are carried out by the governments.

References

External links 
 Karachi website

Neighbourhoods of Karachi
Fishing communities in Pakistan
Gulberg Town, Karachi
Bengali-speaking countries and territories
Karachi Central District